Mother is a Japanese television drama that aired on Nippon TV between 14 April and 23 June 2010, starring Yasuko Matsuyuki.

Synopsis
Nao Suzuhara is a temporary elementary school teacher. When she realizes that one of her students is receiving abuse from her mother, Nao's maternal instincts kick in, and she impulsively decides to bring the girl into her own care. Serving as a substitute mother, Nao takes the child on a trip from Muroran to Tokyo, and the two experience various events together along the way.

Cast
 Yasuko Matsuyuki as Nao Suzuhara
 Mana Ashida as Rena Michiki / Tsugumi Suzuhara
 Koji Yamamoto as Shunsuke Fujiyoshi
 Wakana Sakai as Mei Suzuhara
 Kana Kurashina as Kaho Suzuhara
 Machiko Ono as Hitomi Michiki
 Yosuke Kawamura as Kohei Kimata
 Miwako Ichikawa as Tamami Yuzukawa
 Takuma Oto'o as Keigo Kayama
 Minoru Tanaka as Kensuke Fujiyoshi
 Gō Ayano as Masato Uragami
 Atsuko Takahata as Toko Suzuhara
 Yūko Tanaka as Hana Mochizuki

Episodes

International broadcasts
Mother was broadcast on the Mei Ah Drama Channel in Taiwan and Singapore on August 5, 2011 and in Hong Kong on August 8, 2011.

International remakes

References

External links
Official website

2010 Japanese television series debuts
2010 Japanese television series endings
Japanese drama television series
Nippon TV dramas
Television shows written by Yûji Sakamoto